David Leonard Brain (January 24, 1879 – May 25, 1959) was an infielder/outfielder in Major League Baseball who played for the Chicago White Sox (1901), St. Louis Cardinals (1903–1905), Pittsburgh Pirates (1905), Boston Beaneaters/Doves (1906–1907), Cincinnati Reds (1908) and New York Giants (1908). Brain batted and threw right-handed. He was born in Hereford, England.

Brain was an unreliable fielder who showed some power with his bat and good speed on the basepaths. In 1903 for the St. Louis Cardinals he stole 21 bases and hit 15 triples, including two three-triple games to become the only player in National League history to perform the feat twice in a season. But his accomplishments were overshadowed by his 67 errors – 41 at shortstop and 22 at third base.

In 1904 Brain played around the infield, hitting 24 doubles with 12 triples and 18 stolen bases, and also posted a career-high with 72 runs batted in. In 1905 he divided his playing time between St. Louis and the Pittsburgh Pirates, and played the next two seasons with the Boston teams of the National League. Brain led the league with 10 home runs in 1907 at age 28, but the following season was his last; Brain appeared in 27 games with the Cincinnati Reds and New York Giants while hitting no home runs.

In a seven-season career, Brain was a .252 hitter with 27 home runs and 303 RBI in 679 games.

Brain died in Los Angeles, California, at the age of 80.

See also
 List of Major League Baseball annual home run leaders

References

External links
Baseball Reference

Burials at Rose Hills Memorial Park
National League home run champions
Boston Beaneaters players
Boston Doves players
Chicago White Sox players
St. Louis Cardinals players
Cincinnati Reds players
New York Giants (NL) players
Pittsburgh Pirates players
Major League Baseball infielders
Major League Baseball outfielders
Major League Baseball players from the United Kingdom
Major League Baseball players from England
English baseball players
Sportspeople from Hereford
1879 births
1959 deaths
Chicago White Stockings (minor league) players
Des Moines Hawkeyes players
St. Paul Saints (Western League) players
Buffalo Bisons (minor league) players
St. Paul Saints (AA) players